Graphisoft EcoDesigner is an energy evaluation tool for architects – an add-on software for ArchiCAD, Graphisoft's BIM application – which aims to provide information about a building's energy performance at the early design phases giving fast feedback for architects on the energy efficiency and sustainability of certain design alternatives.

Features

With EcoDesigner, architects can get results about the energy consumption, Carbon footprint and the monthly energy balance in three steps:

 Data input: specifying physical properties of the already modeled building envelope using the default values set for different type of building parts or entering custom data, setting up location, weather data, building type and HVAC systems for the project.
 Evaluation: EcoDesigner passes the data to StruSoft's VIP-Energy calculation engine, which performs a dynamic analysis.
 Results: report sheets available also in PDF format shows the results of the evaluation of the building shell, the energy consumption and cost values, the carbon footprint and the monthly energy balance.

References

External links
 

Computer-aided design
Building information modeling
Sustainable architecture
Low-energy building